Nordic Bouldering and Lead Climbing Championships are an annual set of two climbing competitions. Both competitions include junior and senior categories in the same event.

Rules 
Nordic Bouldering and Lead Climbing Championships for seniors follow either IFSC or EYC rules depending on the organizers choice with only a qualification and final round. Nordic Bouldering and Lead Climbing Championships for juniors follow the EYC rules.

Nordic Bouldering medalists

Senior medalists

Junior medalists

Juniors medalists

Youth A medalists

Youth B medalists

Nordic Lead Climbing medalists

Senior medalists

Junior medalists

Junior medalists

Youth A medalists

Youth B medalists

References

Inter-Nordic sports competitions
Climbing competitions